Caloundra bus station was opened on 16 April 1992 by Minister for Transport David Hamill. It is serviced by six Sunbus routes. It is in Zone 5 of the TransLink integrated public transport system.

Located in Cooma Terrace, Caloundra the interchange boasts an air-conditioned waiting room and travel agent. A two-storey car park is located above the bus station.

Services
Sunbus operate six routes via Caloundra bus station:
600: to Maroochydore via Mooloolaba
602: to Maroochydore via Mountain Creek
603: Bellavista to Corbould Park
605: to Landsborough station
607: to University of the Sunshine Coast
609: to Pelican Waters

References

Bus stations in South East Queensland
Caloundra
Public transport in Sunshine Coast, Queensland
1992 establishments in Australia